A Sense of Freedom is a 1981 Scottish crime film directed by John Mackenzie for Scottish Television. The film stars David Hayman and featured Jake D'Arcy, Sean Scanlan, Hector Nicol, Alex Norton and Fulton Mackay. It is based on the autobiography of Glasgow gangster Jimmy Boyle, who was reputed to be Scotland's most violent man. Due to non-co-operation by the Scottish Prison Service in allowing a film crew access to their property, Hayman's scenes in prison were filmed in Dublin's Kilmainham Jail.

A harrowing tale of a habitual and brutal criminal. Boyle repeatedly resisted attempts by the Prison Service to dampen his temper. He was brutally assaulted many times by Prison Officers. He also assaulted many staff including a brutal attack causing an officer to lose his eye.

The film received a BAFTA nomination for Best Single Play.

The music is by Frankie Miller and Rory Gallagher.

Cast
Jimmy Boyle - David Hayman
Rab - Jake D'Arcy
Jada - Sean Scanlan
Malkie - Alex Norton
Piper - John Murtagh
Chief officer - Roy Hanlon
Inspector Davidson - Fulton Mackay
Bobbie Dougan - Martin Black
Uncle Jodie - Hector Nicol
Barman - Frank Welshman
Boyle's mother - Katy Gardiner
Archie - Billy Jeffrey
Judge - David Steuart
Prison officer - Ken Drury
Prison governor - Gerry Slevin
Prison governor - Ron Paterson
Prison governor - Hugh Martin
Special unit officer - Jackie Farrell

References

External links

1980s prison films
1981 films
Scottish films
British docudrama films
Scottish television shows
Television shows produced by Scottish Television
1981 in Scotland
History of Glasgow
Culture in Glasgow
1980s in Scottish television
Television shows set in Glasgow
1981 in British television
British prison drama films
Films directed by John Mackenzie (film director)
1981 drama films
1985 drama films
1985 films
1980s English-language films
1980s British films